Riverside Hospital may refer to:

 Riverside Hospital of Ottawa, in Ontario, Canada
 Riverside Methodist Hospital, in Columbus, Ohio, U.S.
 Riverside Medical Center, in Kankakee, Illinois, U.S.
 Riverside University Health System Medical Center, Moreno Valley, California, U.S.
 Riverside Hospital, a former hospital on North Brother Island, New York, U.S.
 Riverside Community Hospital, in Riverside, California, U.S.
 Meadowlands Hospital Medical Center, formerly Riverside Hospital, in Secaucus, New Jersey, U.S.